This is the discography of English rock band the Chameleons.

Albums

Studio albums

Live albums

Compilation albums

Video albums

Other albums

EPs

Singles

References

Discographies of British artists
Rock music group discographies
New wave discographies